Muhammad Shah I, born Tatar Khan, was a ruler of the Muzaffarid dynasty, who reigned over the Gujarat Sultanate briefly from 1403 to 1404 disposing his father Muzaffar Shah I.

Early life
About 1396, Zafar Khan's son Tatar Khan, leaving his baggage in the fort of Panipat, made an attempt to capture Delhi. But Iqbál Khán took the fort of Pánipat, captured Tátár Khán's baggage, and forced him to withdraw to Gujarát.

On the death of Nasir ud din Muhammad Shah III in 1392, his son Sikandar assumed the throne but he died just after 45 days. He was succeeded by his brother Nasir-ud-Din Mahmud Shah Tughluq II but his cousin Nusrat Khan also claimed similar rank in Firuzabad. In prevailing situation, Timur invaded India and marched on Delhi in 1398. In early 1399, he defeated Mahmud II and looted and destroyed the much of Delhi. Sultan Mahmud II escaped and after many wanderings, reached Patan. He hoped to secure Zafar Khan's alliance to march to Delhi but Zafar Khan declined. He went to Malwa where he was declined again by local governor. Meanwhile, his Wazir Iqbal Khan had expelled Nusrat Khan from Delhi so he returned to Delhi but he had no longer enough authority over provinces which were ruled independently by his governors.

Reign
In 1403, Zafar Khan's son Tatar Khan urged his father to march on Delhi to take advantage of the situation, which he declined. As a result, in 1403, Tatar imprisoned him in Ashaval (future Ahmedabad) and declared himself sultan under the title of Muhammad Shah I. He humbled the chief of Nandod in Rajpipla. He marched towards Delhi, but on the way he was poisoned by his uncle, Shams Khán Dandáni at Sinor on the north bank of Narmada river.  Some sources says he died naturally due to weather or due to his habit of heavy drinking. After the death of Muhammad Shah, Zafar was released from the prison in 1404. Zafar Khán asked his own younger brother Shams Khán Dandáni to carry on the government, but he refused. Zafar took over the control over administration. In 1407, he declared himself as Sultan Muzaffar Shah I at Birpur or Sherpur, took the insignia of royalty and issued coins in his name.

References

Bibliography

  
  

Gujarat sultans
1404 deaths
14th-century Indian monarchs